The 1986 Duke Blue Devils football team represented the Duke Blue Devils of Duke University during the 1986 NCAA Division I-A football season.

Schedule

Roster

Team players in the NFL

References

Duke
Duke Blue Devils football seasons
Duke Blue Devils football